Adoor Gopalakrishnan (born 3 July 1941) is an Indian film director, script writer, and producer and is regarded as one of the most notable and renowned filmmakers in India. With the release of his first feature film Swayamvaram (1972), Gopalakrishnan pioneered the new wave in Malayalam cinema during the 1970s. In a career spanning over five decades, Gopalakrishnan has made only 12 feature films to date. His films are made in the Malayalam language and often depict the society and culture of his native state Kerala. Nearly all of his films premiered at Venice, Cannes and Toronto International Film Festival. Along with Satyajit Ray and Mrinal Sen, Gopalakrishnan is one of the most recognized Indian film directors in world cinema.

For his films, Gopalakrishnan has won the National Film Award 16 times, next only to Ray and Sen. He also won the Kerala State Film Awards 17 times. He was awarded the State honours Padma Shri in 1984 and the Padma Vibhushan in 2006. He received the Dadasaheb Phalke Award in 2004 for his valuable contributions to Indian cinema. In 2016, he was awarded the J. C. Daniel Award, Kerala government's highest honour for contributions to Malayalam cinema. The University of Wisconsin-Milwaukee have established an archive and research center, the Adoor Gopalakrishnan Film Archive and Research Center, at their Peck School of Arts where research students will have access to 35 mm prints of the eleven feature films and several documentaries made by Gopalakrishnan.

Biography
Gopalakrishnan was born on 3 July 1941 in the village of Pallickal (Medayil Bungalow) near Adoor, present day Kerala. 

After securing a degree in Economics, Political Science and Public Administration in 1961 from the Gandhigram Rural Institute, he worked as a Government officer near Dindigul in Tamil Nadu. In 1962, he left his job to study screenwriting and direction from the Film and Television Institute of India Pune. He completed his course from there with a scholarship from the Government of India. With his classmates and friends, Gopalakrishnan established Chithralekha Film Society and Chalachithra Sahakarana Sangham; the organization was the first film society in Kerala and it aimed at production, distribution and exhibition of films in the co-operative sector.

Gopalakrishnan's debut film, the national award-winning Swayamvaram (1972) was a milestone in Malayalam film history. The film was exhibited widely in various international film festivals including those held in Moscow, Melbourne, London and Paris. The films that followed namely Kodiyettam, Elippathayam, Mukhamukham, Anantaram, Mathilukal, Vidheyan and Kathapurushan lived up to the reputation of his first film and were well received by critics at various film festivals and fetched him many awards. However, Mukhamukham was criticized in Kerala while Vidheyan was at the centre of a debate due to the differences in opinion between the writer of story of the film Sakhariya and Gopalakrishnan.

Gopalakrishnan's later films are Nizhalkuthu, narrating the experiences of an executioner who learns that one of his subjects was innocent, and Naalu Pennungal, a film adaptation of four short stories by Thakazhi Sivasankara Pillai.

All his films have won national and international awards (National award for best film twice, best director five times, and best script two times. His films have also won his actors and technicians several national awards). Gopalakrishnan's third feature, Elippathayam won him the coveted British Film Institute Award for 'the most original and imaginative film' of 1982. The International Film Critics Prize (FIPRESCI) has gone to him six times successively for Mukhamukham, Anantharam, Mathilukal, Vidheyan, Kathapurushan and Nizhalkkuthu. Winner of several international awards like the UNICEF film prize (Venice), OCIC film prize (Amiens), INTERFILM Prize (Mannheim) etc., his films have been shown in Cannes, Venice, Berlin, Toronto, London, Rotterdam and every important festival around the world.

In consideration of his contribution to Indian cinema, the nation honoured him with the title of Padma Shri (India's fourth highest civilian award) in 1984 and Padma Vibhushan (India's second highest civilian award) in 2006.

Gopalakrishnan is settled in Thiruvananthapuram (Trivandrum) in Kerala. His daughter Aswathi Dorje is an IPS officer (part of the Assam cadre, 2000 batch), currently acting as Deputy Commissioner of Police in Mumbai since June 2010.

Documentaries and 'New Cinema' movement

Apart from nine feature films, he has over 30 short films and documentaries to his credit. The Helsinki Film Festival was the first film festival to have a retrospective of his films. He has headed the jury at the National Film Awards and many international film festivals.

Apart from his films, Gopalakrishnan's major contribution towards introducing a new cinema culture in Kerala was the constitution of the first Film Society in Kerala, "Chitralekha Film Society". He also took active part in the constitution of "Chitralekha", Kerala's first Film Co-operative Society for film production. These movements triggered a fresh wave of films, called "art films", by directors like G Aravindan, PA Becker, KG George, Pavithran, and Raveendran. At a time this movement was so strong that even popular cinema synthesised with art cinema to create a new genre of films. Bharat Gopi starred as hero 4 times in his ventures.

Style and trademarks

According to Gopalakrishnan "[i]n movies, the actor is not performing to the audience like the stage actor. Here they are acting for me. I am the audience and I will decide whether it is correct or not, enough or not."

Awards and milestones
Some of the awards and appreciation Gopalakrishnan has won for his films include:

 2016 - On the occasion of India celebrating its 70th Independence day, news agency NDTV compiled a list called "70 Years, 70 Great Films" and Swayamvaram was among the four Malayalam films that found place in the list.
 2015- Biswaratna Dr Bhupen Hazarika International Solidarity Award 
 2013 - Kerala Sahitya Akademi Award C. B. Kumar Endowment for Cinema yum Samskaravum (Essay)
 2010 - Honorary Doctorate (D.Litt) from University of Kerala
 2006 - Padma Vibhushan — Second highest civilian award from Government of India
 2004 - Dadasaheb Phalke Award — Lifetime Achievement Award in Film awarded by the Government of India
 1996 - Honorary Doctorate (D.Litt) from Mahatma Gandhi University
 1984 - Padma Shri — Fourth highest civilian award from Government of India.
 1984 - Legion of Honour — French order, the highest decoration in France
National Film Awards — Various categories for Swayamvaram, Kodiyettam, Elippathayam, Mukhamukham, Anantaram, Mathilukal, Vidheyan, Kathapurushan, Nizhalkkuthu and Naalu Pennungal
 Kerala State Film Awards: — Various categories for Kodiyettam, Elippathayam, Mukhamukham, Anantaram, Vidheyan and Oru Pennum Randaanum
International Film Critics Prize (FIPRESCI) — won consecutively for six feature films (Mukhamukham, Anantaram, Mathilukal, Vidheyan, Kathapurushan and Nizhalkkuthu)
London Film Festival — Sutherland Trophy — in 1982 for Elippathayam
British Film Institute Award — Most Original Imaginative Film of 1982 — Elippathayam
Commandeur of the Ordre des Arts et des Lettres by French Government (2003)
Lifetime achievement award at Cairo International Film Festival.

National Film Awards (Detailed):

 1973 - Best Film - Swayamvaram
 1973 - Best Director - Swayamvaram
 1978 - Best Feature Film in Malayalam - Kodiyettam
 1980 - National Film Award – Special Jury Award / Special Mention (Non-Feature Film) - The Chola Heritage
 1982 - Best Feature Film in Malayalam - Elippathayam
 1984 - Best Book on Cinema - Cinemayude Lokam
 1985 - Best Director - Mukhamukham
 1985 - Best Feature Film in Malayalam - Mukhamukham
 1985 - Best Screenplay - Mukhamukham
 1988 - Best Director - Anantharam
 1988 - Best Screenplay - Anantharam
 1990 - Best Director - Mathilukal
 1990 - Best Feature Film in Malayalam - Mathilukal
 1994 - Best Feature Film in Malayalam - Vidheyan
 1995 - Best Film - Kathapurushan
 2003 - Best Feature Film in Malayalam - Nizhalkkuthu
 2008 - Best Director - Naalu Pennungal

Kerala State Film Awards (Detailed):

Best Film

 1977 - Best Film - Kodiyettam
 1981 - Best Film - Elippathayam
 1984 - Best Film - Mukhamukham
 1993 - Best Film - Vidheyan
 2008 - Best Film - Oru Pennum Randaanum

Best Director

 1977 - Best Director - Kodiyettam
 1984 - Best Director - Mukhamukham
 1987 - Best Director - Anantharam
 1993 - Best Director - Vidheyan
 2008 - Best Director - Oru Pennum Randaanum

Best Story

 1977 - Best Story - Kodiyettam

Best Screen Play

 1993 - Best Screen Play - Vidheyan
 2008 - Best Screen Play - Oru Pennum Randaanum

Best Documentary Film

 1982 - Best Documentary Film - Krishnanattam
 1999 - Best Documentary Film - Kalamandalam Gopi

Best Short Film

 2005 - Best Short Film - Kalamandalam Ramankutty Nair

Best Book on Cinema

 2004 - Best Book on Cinema - Cinemanubhavam

Kerala Film Critics Association Awards (Detailed):
 1984 - Best Film - Mukhamukham
 1987 - Best Director - Anantaram
 1989 - Best Film - Mathilukal
 1989 - Best Director - Mathilukal
 1993 - Best Film - Vidheyan
 1993 - Best Director - Vidheyan
 1995 - Best Film - Kathapurushan
 1995 - Best Director - Kathapurushan
 2016 - Ruby Jubilee Award

A retrospective of his films was conducted in

Kolkata, by Seagull Foundation for the Arts and Nandan, 2009.
 The Slovenian International Film Festival, 2009.
 The Munich Film Museum, 2009.
 The French Cinematheque, Paris, 1999.

Filmography

References

Further reading

External links

 Official website of Adoor
 Official Website of Information and Public Relation Department of Kerala
 
 Adoor's oeuvre on Rediff
 Collection of photos of Adoor
 Profile of Adoor on Weblokam
 Profile at 'Cinema of Malayalam' 
  'The Road to Modern Times', Naalu Pennungal and the cinema of Adoor Gopalakrishnan, Mint Lounge 8 September 2007, by Arjun Razdan
 

1941 births
Living people
Best Director National Film Award winners
Directors who won the Best Feature Film National Film Award
Best Original Screenplay National Film Award winners
Producers who won the Best Feature Film National Film Award
J. C. Daniel Award winners
Kerala State Film Award winners
Recipients of the Legion of Honour
Commandeurs of the Ordre des Arts et des Lettres
Recipients of the Padma Shri in arts
Recipients of the Padma Vibhushan in arts
Dadasaheb Phalke Award recipients
Film and Television Institute of India alumni
Malayalam screenwriters
Film producers from Kerala
Film directors from Kerala
Malayalam film directors
Indian documentary filmmakers
People from Pathanamthitta district
20th-century Indian film directors
Screenwriters from Kerala
Malayalam film producers
Malayalam film cinematographers
Cinematographers from Kerala
21st-century Indian film directors
20th-century Indian photographers
21st-century Indian photographers
20th-century Indian dramatists and playwrights
21st-century Indian dramatists and playwrights
Malayali people